Where the Wild Things Are is a 1963 children's book by American writer Maurice Sendak.

Where the Wild Things Are may also refer to:

Adaptations 
 Where the Wild Things Are (opera), an opera by Oliver Knussen, adapted from the book 
 Where the Wild Things Are (film), a 2009 film adaptation of the book, directed by Spike Jonze
 Where the Wild Things Are (video game), a video game adapted from the film

Music 
 Where the Wild Things Are (Agent Provocateur album), 1997
 Where the Wild Things Are (Blackout Records album), a 1989 compilation album of New York hardcore bands
 Where the Wild Things Are (Steve Vai album), 2009
 Where the Wild Things Are: Motion Picture Soundtrack, soundtrack to the 2009 film adaptation
 "Where the Wild Things Are", a song by Metallica from ReLoad, 1997
 "Where the Wild Things Are", a song by Zeds Dead and Illenium, 2017
 "Where the Wild Thing Are (Monsters)", a song by Anarbor from Free Your Mind, 2009

Television 
 "Where the Wild Things Are" (Buffy the Vampire Slayer), an episode of Buffy the Vampire Slayer
 "Where the Wild Things Are" (Grey's Anatomy), an episode of Grey's Anatomy